Masjid al-Qiblatayn (Arabic: مَـسْـجِـد الْـقِـبْـلَـتَـيْـن) is a mosque in Zeila, situated in the western Awdal region of Somaliland, a de facto sovereign state in the Horn of Africa.

Description and history
The mosque was built in the 7th century CE shortly after the hijrah, the migration of the early followers of Muhammad to Abyssinia. Now mostly in ruins, it is one of the oldest mosques in Africa and the World and contains the tomb of Sheikh Babu Dena. The mosque's name means 'mosque of the two qiblahs', referring to its two mihrabs: one oriented north toward Mecca, and the other northwest toward Jerusalem.

Influence of the companions 
The construction of this mosque is tied to the history of Islam in Somaliland. The mosque is known as the site of where early companions of the prophet Muhammad established a mosque shortly after the first migration to Abyssinia.

See also
  Lists of mosques 
  List of mosques in Africa
  List of mosques in Egypt
 Arba'a Rukun Mosque
 Fakr ad-Din Mosque
 Islam in Africa
 Mosque of Islamic Solidarity
Dir (clan)
Marehan

References

Further reading

7th-century mosques
Awdal
Mosques in Somaliland